Hanoi Capital Region or Hanoi Metropolitan Area is a metropolitan area currently planned by the government of Vietnam. This metropolitan area was created by decision 490/QD-TTg dated May 5, 2008 of the Prime Minister of Vietnam. Hanoi will be the core city of this metropolitan area. Other component parts will include provinces: Vĩnh Phúc Province, Hưng Yên Province, Bắc Ninh Province, Hải Dương Province, Hà Nam Province, Hòa Bình, Bắc Giang Province, Phú Thọ Province and Thái Nguyên Province with an area of 24.314,7 km², half of the size of Greater Ho Chi Minh City, the same for population size planning.

As Hà Tây was merged into Hanoi by a resolution of the National Assembly of Vietnam in June 2008, this metropolitan area will include Hanoi and six surrounding provinces.

As 2012, this Metropolitan area will include Hanoi and nine Provinces.

As of 2012, this metropolitan area has a population of 17 million, of which, 4.6 million live in urban areas, by 2020, the number will be 20-22 and 12-13 million respectively.

Component localities

This metropolitan area will straddle in following provinces: 
Hanoi
Vĩnh Phúc Province
Hải Dương Province
Hưng Yên Province
Bắc Ninh Province
Bắc Giang Province
Thái Nguyên Province
Phú Thọ Province
Hòa Bình Province
Hà Nam Province

Major cities 
Current cities and towns (as of 2012)  

Hanoi, core city
Hải Dương
Bắc Ninh
Vĩnh Yên
Phủ Lý
Hưng Yên
Hòa Bình
Bắc Giang
Việt Trì
Thái Nguyên
Sơn Tây Town
Major adjacent cities:
Hai Phong, major port city
Hạ Long, major port city
Nam Định

See also
Ho Chi Minh City Metropolitan Area

References

Administration of Hanoi
Hanoi
Metropolitan areas of Vietnam